Abdulelah Al-Fahad is a Saudi football player who plays as a midfielder .

Honours
Al-Fayha
 Saudi First Division: 2016–17

Reference

External links 
 Fahadalbahoth 

1992 births
Living people
Saudi Arabian footballers
Al-Faisaly FC players
Al-Fayha FC players
Al-Shoulla FC players
Al-Washm Club players
Place of birth missing (living people)
Saudi First Division League players
Saudi Professional League players
Association football midfielders